The Towrope is a 2012 Colombian / French / Mexican drama film directed by William Vega. The film was screened at the Directors' Fortnight event of the 2012 Cannes Film Festival.

References

External links 

Colombian drama films
French drama films
Mexican drama films
2012 drama films
2012 films
2010s French films
2010s Mexican films
2010s Colombian films